Bing-bong, Bing Bong, Bingbong or variation, may refer to:

 "Bing Bong" (song), by Super Furry Animals
 Vincent Crisologo, nicknamed "Bingbong" (born 1947) Filipino politician
 Salvador Medialdea, nicknamed "Bingbong" (born 1951) Filipino lawyer
 Richard Bong, leading ace of WWII and Medal of Honor recipient
"Bing Bong", a comedic catchphrase popularized by web series Sidetalk
 Bing Bong, a character from the 2015 Disney film Inside Out
 Bing Bong the Archer, Troy's character in the 2011 television episode Advanced Dungeons & Dragons (Community)
 Bingbong, a character from the 2011 Philippine film The Woman in the Septic Tank
 Bing Bong Island, a fictional location from the 2002 videogame Moop and Dreadly in the Treasure on Bing Bong Island
 The Bing Bong Brothers, a stage name used by musical comedy act The Lonely Island
 Bing Bong, a song by fictional Khazakh singer Korky Buchek, the favourite artist of the character Borat played by Sacha Baron Cohen

See also
 Ping-pong (disambiguation)
 Bing (disambiguation)
 Bong (disambiguation)